Souliya Syphasay (born 18 December 1993 in Vientiane, Laos) is Laotian footballer who plays for home town club Ezra in Lao League as a defender. He is a member of Laos national football team and played at the 2010 AFF Suzuki Cup and 2014 FIFA World Cup qualifiers.

References

External links 
 Goal.com profile

1993 births
Living people
Laotian footballers
People from Vientiane
Association football defenders
Laos international footballers